The 1971–72 SK Rapid Wien season was the 74th season in club history.

Squad

Squad and statistics

Squad statistics

Fixtures and results

League

Cup

UEFA Cup

References

1971-72 Rapid Wien Season
Rapid